Birgit Wagner (born 21 January 1969) is a German handball player. She competed in the women's tournament at the 1992 Summer Olympics.

References

External links
 

1969 births
Living people
German female handball players
Olympic handball players of Germany
Handball players at the 1992 Summer Olympics
Sportspeople from Rostock